John Northampton (also known as John Comberton) (died 1398) was a reformist Lord Mayor of London in 1381 and 1382, during dissension in favour of reform of its Common Council in the early years of Richard II's reign. When the oligarchic leaders of London were able to engineer the overthrow of his faction, even the book of records of reform legislation was burned, known as the Jubilee book. The mob politics of such radical movements increased the uneasiness of the great about allowing popular participation in government.

He had also served as Sheriff of London in 1376-77.

Family
Northampton was raised in London, son of Thomas and Mariota Northampton.  He is known to have had two brothers, William and Robert, and two sisters, Petronilla and Agnes.

He was twice married.  His first wife, living in 1371, was named Johanna, his second, to whom he was married by 1375, Petronilla, daughter of John Preston and Margaret Constantine (also spelt Constantyn).  By one of those marriages he left a son named James.

Northampton became alternatively known as John Comberton in the writings of chroniclers playing on the word comber (trouble) in reflection of the trouble that opponents thought his policies caused London.

Career to 1383
Northampton came early into business in the city, being named as one of four 'upholders' of the Drapers' Guild in 1361.  Outside his work he may have gained a turbulent reputation for he was bound over the keep the peace and refrain from affrays in the streets in 1365, 1369 and 1371.

He entered city politics in the Common Council as Alderman for the Cordwainer Street Ward from 1375 to 1377, and became Sheriff of the city in 1376. He became leader of the faction in the city that supported John of Gaunt and John Wycliffe, in contrast to the other party led by William Walworth and John Philipot who supported the opposition to Gaunt.

Following the Good Parliament of 1376, he was one of a cohort of Londoners who ousted Richard Lyons and others from city offices and introduced the rule that Common Council members be chosen according to craft guild affiliations rather than by city ward.  In 1378 he was elected as Member of Parliament for the City in that year's parliament.

He served two terms as Lord Mayor from 1381 to 1383, characterized by measures to help London's less prosperous citizens. He was opposed to the monopoly of the fishmongers, and broke this by enacting ordinances to open the markets to non-resident tradesmen and forbidding the wholesale purchase of fish for profit.  He later applied such measures to trade in bread, ale, wine and poultry.  He increased the circulation of farthings by reminting £80 into 76,000 coins, ordered bakers to make farthing measures of bread for sale, and ordered that traders, mass priests and others accept payments in the coin or give their services free.  There were also moralistic ordinances made against prostitution, misrepresentation and false practices in business.

A servant of Northampton's during his mayoralty was Thomas Usk who, after being arrested in 1384 by Northampton's rival Nicholas Brembre, gained release by informing on his former master through a legal appeal.

Arrest, imprisonment, pardon
At the election in 1383 Northampton was ousted by Brembre, who packed the Guildhall with armed support and got himself elected.  Brembre had  Northampton arrested on charges of sedition on 7 February 1384, and provoking an 'insurrection' in the city on the 11th, involving shop closures by supporters.  His kinsman, John Constantine, was executed for his part in leading this.  Northampton and two associates, John More and Richard Norbury, were sentenced to death in trial before the King at Reading, Berkshire but this was commuted to 10 years' imprisonment, each man to be held in a separate prison at least 100 leagues outside London.  Northampton, possibly through the influence of Cornish judge Sir Robert Tresilian, was confined at Tintagel.

In 1386 the King pardoned Northampton but he remained banished from the city.  Following the Merciless Parliament, as a result of which Brembre and Usk were executed in 1388, his situation improved with a full pardon granted in December 1390 and a full restoration of his citizenship in 1395.

Last years
Northampton died in 1398 and was buried in the church of the Hospital of St Mary de Elsyngspital, Cripplegate.  He had prospered to the extent of leaving property valued about £5,000, enabling him to be a benefactor to the Charterhouse monastery, to whose monks he made gifts of dates, figs and raisins during Lent.

See also
Thomas Usk

References

External links
Florilegium Urbanum: Party politics lead to civil disorder

Year of birth missing
14th-century lord mayors of London
Sheriffs of the City of London
English MPs 1378
1398 deaths
Members of the Parliament of England for the City of London